United States v. Freed, 401 U.S. 601 (1971), was a United States Supreme Court case in which the Court held the National Firearms Act's registration requirements do not violate the Fifth Amendment to the United States Constitution. Additionally, the Court held that the Act's restrictions against a person's "receiv[ing] or possess[ing] a firearm which is not registered to him," did not require the recipient to have the specific intent to possess an unregistered firearm. Consequently, the Court ruled that the buyer of unregistered hand grenades was subject to criminal liability, despite a lack of a requirement that the defendant have had a "specific intent or knowledge that the hand grenades were unregistered."

Decision of the Court
The Court concluded, "This is a regulatory measure in the interest of the public safety, which may well be premised on the theory that one would hardly be surprised to learn that possession of hand grenades is not an innocent act."

References

External links
 

United States Supreme Court cases
United States Supreme Court cases of the Burger Court
1971 in United States case law
United States Supreme Court criminal cases
United States Fifth Amendment case law
United States federal firearms case law